Seven Thorns is a Danish power metal band formed in 1998. The group have undergone multiple changes in line-up leading up to the release of their debut album, Return to the Past in 2010. Despite being somewhat latecomers to the power metal scene, Seven Thorns' sound draws heavily on the "old school of power metal" citing influences by bands such as Gamma Ray, Helloween and Stratovarius.

History
The band was founded in 1998 by drummer Lars Borup. However, the search for other permanent band members was unsuccessful, so Seven Thorns was put on hold in 2000. In 2004 Mik Holm joined Lars as songwriter and lead singer which led to the first complete line-up later that same year. The band's first single Artificial Night was recorded and released in the beginning of 2005 and was nominated for a Danish Metal Award.

From 2005 to 2007 Seven Thorns was on hiatus with the exit of Mik and the addition of a new lead singer. The band name was changed to 7thorns, which, despite the name similarity, was only meant as a side project. 7thorns wrote and recorded one album entitled Glow of Dawn but this was never released officially. The "original" Seven Thorns was revived again in 2007 by Mik and Lars after the 7thorns project had been terminated. Although Mik does not function as an active member as such, he contributes to the songwriting for Seven Thorns.
 
Seven Thorns was ready with new line-up in late 2008 and a single entitled Forest Majesty was recorded over New Year of 2008-09 and released in March 2009 by Airbourne Records, a small Danish label.

After the release of the debut album Return to the Past in 2010 through Nightmare Records Seven Thorns signed a promotion contract with the German agency Rock N Growl. The promotion deal resulted in numerous top class reviews by magazines and e-zines from all over the world as well as radio airplay in both Europe, The United States and Japan.

In the summer of 2011 Seven Thorns embarked on their first European tour along with Circle II Circle playing multiple shows and festivals. They have since toured with American glam metal act Lillian Axe, also promoting the arrival of their new lead singer, Gustav Blide. Seven Thorns have shared the stage with bands such as Anvil, Jørn Lande, Raven, and Gun Barrel.

The band's follow-up album, entitled II was released in February 2014 which garnered equal amounts of positive reviews and radio airplay. As the recording of II was still ongoing when Blide joined the line-up the lead vocals were performed by Erik Blomkvist. However, Blide provided the majority of backing vocals for the album.

Between mid-2014 and mid-2015 Gustav Blide, Christian Strøjer and Nicolaj Marker left the band to attend to other obligations. Björn Asking and Mads Mølbæk joined the ranks of Seven Thorns, covering the duties of lead singer and bassist respectively.

Members

Current
Björn Asking - vocals
Asger W. Nielsen - keyboards
Gabriel Tuxen - guitar
Lars Borup - drums (ex-Illnath)
Mads Mølbæk - bass

Former
Gustav Blide - vocals 2012-2014
Christian Strøjer - guitar 2008-2014
Dr. No - guitar 1998-2000
Daniel Stilling - guitar 1999
Peter Falk - guitar (Illnath) 2004-2006
Jesper Munk - guitar 2003-2006
Pil - keyboards 2003-2004
Nicolaj Marker - bass 2008-2015
Tommy Strauss - bass 2003-2004
Artur Meinhild - keyboards (Illnath, Evil Masquerade) 2004-2006

Discography

Studio albums
Return to the Past (2010)
II (2013)
Symphony of Shadows (2018)

EPs
"Artificial Night" (released under the name 7thorns) (2005)

References

External links
 Band's official website

Musical groups established in 1998
Danish power metal musical groups